Periklis Tsirigotis (Greek: Περικλής Τσιριγώτης; 1860, Corfu - 1924, Cairo) was a Greek Orientalist painter.

Biography 

He was born on Corfu and had his first art lessons there from Charalambos Pachis, who introduced him to the other painters in the Heptanese School.<ref>"Periklis Tsirigotis," [Biographical Notes], Basic biographical data Modern Greek Visual Prosopography]</ref>

From there, he went to Rome to complete his studies. He briefly returned to Corfu, but soon left for Cairo to do restorative work at various Greek Orthodox churches there.

He also established a studio and gave private lessons, but eventually took a position as a teacher at a local French Jesuit school.

Although he did some portraits, he focused on the people and landscapes of Egypt. He exhibited at Olympia in 1888, Berlin in 1896, at the Zappeion in 1898 and was one of the first to help establish regular exhibitions in Cairo. His paintings were shown and sold in London, New York and Saint Petersburg.

Eight large paintings of his may be seen at the Patriarchal Church of Saint Nicholas in Cairo. Many of his works are kept at the National Gallery in Athens.

See also

 List of Orientalist artists
 Orientalism

References

Herakles Papamanolis (ed.), Η Σφαίρα : επιστημονικόν-φιλολογικόν και καλλιτεχνικόν λεύκωμα'' (The Sphere: Scientific, Literary and Artistic Album), Sphere Printing, Piraeus, 1903. [http://anemi.lib.uoc.gr/metadata/d/5/2/metadata-240-0000020.tkl Full text @ Anemi

External links

ArtNet: More works by Tsirigotis.
Works by Tsirigotis @ Hellenica World

1860 births
1924 deaths
19th-century Greek painters
20th-century Greek painters
Orientalist painters
Artists from Corfu